Statistics of Czechoslovak First League in the 1958–59 season.

Overview
It was contested by 14 teams, and CH Bratislava won the championship. Miroslav Wiecek was the league's top scorer with 20 goals.

Stadia and locations

League standings

Results

Top goalscorers

References

Czechoslovakia - List of final tables (RSSSF)

Czechoslovak First League seasons
Czech
1958–59 in Czechoslovak football